Scorodocarpus is a monotypic genus of plant in the family Olacaceae. It has also been classified in the family Strombosiaceae. The generic name is from the Greek meaning "garlic fruit", referring to the smell of the fruit.  The Plant List recognises the single species Scorodocarpus borneensis. The specific epithet  is from the Latin meaning "of Borneo".

Description
The fissured bark is grey to dark red or brown. The flowers are white. The fruits have a garlic smell and are cooked and eaten in Borneo. The tree's durable hard wood is locally used in construction.

Distribution and habitat
Scorodocarpus borneensis grows naturally in Peninsular Thailand, Sumatra, the Lingga Islands, Peninsular Malaysia and Borneo. Its habitat is mixed dipterocarp forests, occasionally in seasonally flooded forests.

References

Olacaceae
Trees of Thailand
Trees of Sumatra
Trees of Peninsular Malaysia
Trees of Borneo
Monotypic Santalales genera
Taxa named by Odoardo Beccari
Taxa named by Henri Ernest Baillon